The Scarborough Malvern LRT was a proposed light rail line in Toronto, Ontario, Canada. It was part of Transit City, a plan to develop new light rail lines along several priority transit corridors in the city. In January 2016, the plan for this light rail route was revived and rebranded as Eglinton East LRT.

History
The Scarborough Malvern LRT was part of the Transit City proposal announced on 16 March 2007, to be operated by the Toronto Transit Commission. It was expected to cost approximately $1.26billion including vehicles, property, escalation and an apportioned cost of the Maintenance and Storage facilities. With construction originally to begin in 2014, the line was expected to open in 2019 as the last of the seven Transit City lines.

The Scarborough Malvern LRT was approved by Toronto City Council on 30 September 2009, and the environmental assessment received a notice to proceed from the Government of Ontario on 15 December 2009. However, it was cancelled by Rob Ford on 1 December 2010, when he announced the cancellation of Transit City. While LRT lines on Sheppard East, Finch West, and Eglinton were revived through a new agreement between the City of Toronto and Metrolinx, the Scarborough Malvern LRT was not included.

The Scarborough Malvern LRT is still included in Metrolinx's regional transportation plan The Big Move under the 25-year horizon. Aspects of the Scarborough Malvern LRT were then incorporated into the 905 Eglinton East Express (formerly the 198 U of T Scarborough Rocket) bus.

On 20 January 2016, City staff recommended revisions to the Scarborough subway plan that would include reviving the original plan for the Scarborough Malvern LRT, to be rebranded as "Crosstown East".

Route layout
The southern terminus of the line would be built at Kennedy station at Kennedy Road and Eglinton Avenue, with a connection to Line 2 Bloor–Danforth, Line 3 Scarborough, and  Line 5 Eglinton. The whole line would be built within Scarborough. The line would run along Eglinton Avenue East until it reaches Kingston Road, then continues northeast until Morningside Avenue is reached, then continues north until Ellesmere Road is reached, then continues east until Military Trail is reached, then continues northwest until Morningside Avenue is reached. Finally, the line turns north at Morningside Avenue, terminating at Sheppard Avenue East where it will meet the future Sheppard East LRT.

The original layout had the LRT continuing north along Morningside Avenue directly to Sheppard Avenue East, without a detour along Ellesmere Road and Military Trail to service the University of Toronto Scarborough.

The original layout also had the LRT continuing west along its current terminus at Sheppard Avenue East, overlapping the Sheppard East LRT line to Neilson Road, where it would turn north and terminate at the Malvern Town Centre. This section was most likely cancelled as the Scarborough RT extension would already be servicing that area.

This layout was revised, and the northern section north of Sheppard was split into a new, independent LRT line called the Malvern LRT, which would continue from Sheppard station. The Malvern LRT is classified a "Future Transit Project" in the 2013 "Feeling Congested?" report by the City of Toronto.

The Scarborough Malvern LRT was rebranded as the "Crosstown East" extension of the Line 5 Eglinton, potentially making the Malvern LRT connect with Line 5 Eglinton at Kennedy in the future.

Proposed stops

The TTC indicated that stops would be spaced on average 400 metres apart. The distances between the stops varies, but they were likely candidates, from north to south:

On Morningside Avenue
 Sheppard Avenue East
 Military Trail
 University of Toronto Scarborough
 Ellesmere Road
 West Hill Collegiate Institute
 Kingston Road

On Kingston Road

 Lawrence Avenue East
 Galloway Road
 Celeste Drive - Guildwood GO Station (connection to Lakeshore East GO train line)
 Guildwood Parkway
 Scarborough Golf Club Road
 Eglinton Avenue East

On Eglinton Avenue East

 Markham Road
 Mason Road
 Bellamy Road North - Eglinton GO Station (connection to Lakeshore East GO train line)
 McCowan Road
 Danforth Road
 Falmouth Avenue
 Midland Avenue
 Kennedy Road - Kennedy station, Kennedy GO Station (connection to Line 2 Bloor–Danforth, Line 3 Scarborough, future Line 5 Eglinton, and Stouffville GO train line)

See also
 Line 5 Eglinton
 Toronto streetcar system
 Toronto subway

References

External links
 Official TTC site

Toronto streetcar system
Light rail in Canada
Transit City
Proposed Toronto rapid transit projects
The Big Move projects